The Chacoan mara (Pediolagus salinicola) or Chacoan cavy is a relatively large South American rodent of the cavy family. They are a close relative of the better known Patagonian mara. The Chacoan mara is the sole member of the genus Pediolagus.

Taxonomy
Until recently Pediolagus was considered synonymous with Dolichotis and the Chacoan mara was a member of that genus. However, a 2020 study by the American Society of Mammalogists found significant difference between the two mara species to warrant resurrecting Pediolagus.

Habitat
The Chacoan mara lives in the South American Chaco, the dry thorny forests and grasslands of Argentina, Paraguay, and Bolivia. Maras dig a burrow to sleep in at night.

Ecology
The Chacoan mara eat grasses and other herbage. They will eat nearly any available vegetation. Specifically, they selects forbs, grasses, succulents, and trees in the dry season and grasses in the wet season. Annual forbs are eaten in the wet season as well.

Despite the Chaocan cavy's close resemblance and coexistence to the Patagonian mara, they have a broader niche to allow coexistence with its relative. This flexibility is reflected by its subfamily's high diversity, recorded as early as the late Miocene epoch.

Chacoan maras live in small groups of up to four animals.

References

Cavies
Mammals of Argentina
Mammals of Bolivia
Mammals of Paraguay
Mammals described in 1876